Godwin Nikoi Kotey (1965 - 2012) was a Ghanaian actor, producer, educator, playwright and director who contributed to the growth and development of the movie industry.

Education 
He attended Tema Senior High School and Ghanata Secondary School. He then furthered his studies at the University of Ghana for his degree and masters in theatre arts and did his Phd. at University of Southern Illinois.

Career 
Godwin lectured at the University of Ghana, he taught Performing Arts. In 1997 and 1997 he directed Smash TV and also Taxi Driver in 1999. In 2008 he was the creative director for the opening and closing ceremony of the 2008 Africa Cup of Nations.

Filmography 
List of movies.

 Police Officer
 I Sing of A Well
 Taxi Driver
 The Scent of Danger
 Etuo Etu Bare 
 Sodom and Gomorrah
 Shoe Shine Boy

Awards 

 He won an award for the film, The Scent of Danger at African Film Festival in Burkina Faso – FESPACO in 2001.
 He also took the best  awards for the TV series Taxi Driver.

Death 
He died of cancer - leukemia after he had treatment in the United States.

References 

1965 births
2012 deaths
Ghanaian male film actors
21st-century Ghanaian male actors